Latin Pop Albums, published in Billboard magazine, is a record chart that features Latin music sales information in regard to Latin pop music. The data is compiled by Nielsen SoundScan from a sample that includes music stores, music departments at electronics and department stores, Internet sales (both physical and digital) and verifiable sales from concert venues in the United States.

Number-one albums
Key
 – Best-selling Latin pop album of the year

References
General

 For information about each week of this chart, follow this link; select a date to view the top albums for that particular week}}

Specific

Pop 2000s
United States Latin Pop Albums
2000
2000s in Latin music